William Henry (March 22, 1788 – April 16, 1861) was an American manufacturer and banker. He represented Vermont in the United States House of Representatives from 1847 to 1851.

Biography
Henry was born on March 22, 1788, in Charlestown, Sullivan County, New Hampshire. He attended the common schools and then engaged in business in Chester, Vermont. He married Fanny Goodhue. He engaged in manufacturing in Vermont, New York, and Jaffery, New Hampshire. When he moved to Bellows Falls, Vermont, in 1831, he engaged in banking as well.

He served as a member of the Vermont House of Representatives in 1834; a member of the Vermont Senate in 1836; a  delegate from Vermont in 1839 to the Whig National Convention at Harrisburg, Pennsylvania, serving as (member, Committee on Permanent Organization; member, Balloting Committee; member, Committee to Notify Nominees); and Presidential Elector for Vermont in 1840. He was also a director of the Rutland & Burlington Railroad Company.

Henry was elected US Representative as a Whig to the Thirtieth and Thirty-first Congresses and served from March 4, 1847 to March 3, 1851.  When he was an unsuccessful candidate for election in 1852 to the Thirty-third Congress, he resumed banking. He was Presidential Elector for Vermont in 1860.

Death
Henry died in Bellows Falls, Vermont, on April 16, 1861.

References

External links
Henry’s biographic note at US Congress website

The Political Graveyard
Govtrack US Congress

1788 births
1861 deaths
Whig Party members of the United States House of Representatives from Vermont
19th-century American politicians